The first American film version of William Shakespeare's Romeo and Juliet was a silent film short made in 1908 made by Vitagraph Studios. Directed by J. Stuart Blackton, it was filmed at Bethesda Terrace in Manhattan, New York.

The film starred Paul Panzer as Romeo and Florence Lawrence as Juliet.

It is now considered lost.

Plot summary

Cast 
 Paul Panzer - Romeo
 Florence Lawrence - Juliet
 John G. Adolfi - Tybalt
 Josephine Atkinson - Bit
 Louise Carver - Nurse
 Charles Chapman - Montague
 Gladys Hulette - 
 Charles Kent - Capulet
 William V. Ranous - Friar Lawrence
 William Shea - Peter
 Harry Solter
 Florence Turner

References

External links 
 

1908 films
American silent short films
Films based on Romeo and Juliet
American black-and-white films
Films directed by J. Stuart Blackton
Vitagraph Studios short films
Lost American films
1900s American films
Silent horror films